Daniel Masur was the defending champion but chose not to defend his title.

Juan Pablo Varillas won the title after defeating Guido Andreozzi 6–3, 6–1 in the final.

Seeds

Draw

Finals

Top half

Bottom half

References

Main draw
Qualifying draw

Biella Challenger V - 1